Ginsberg the Great is a lost 1927 silent film starring George Jessel in the period in which he made films with Warner Bros. The film had a Vitaphone synchronized music score and sound effects.

Plot
Johnny Ginsberg, a tailor's apprentice who aspires to be a famous magician, joins a carnival troupe that stops in the town and doubles for sideshow attractions. The troupers, actually a gang of thieves, direct their chimpanzee to pick the pockets of Sam Hubert, a theatrical magnate who is in the audience, but Johnny recovers the wallet. Sappho, an Oriental dancer, learning that Hubert has purchased the Russian crown jewels, vamps Johnny into taking her to his home; and with the aid of the gang, she steals the jewels. Overhearing the gang quarreling over the spoils, Johnny tries to make a getaway with the gems, knocking out each member of the gang separately and affixing to each of them a tag signed "Ginsberg the Great." Hawkins, a newspaperman, publicizes the event, and Johnny consequently receives a reward and a contract from Hubert.

Cast
George Jessel as Johnny Ginsberg
Audrey Ferris as Mary
Gertrude Astor as Sappho
Douglas Gerrard as Sam Hubert
Jack Santoro as Hawkins
Theodore Lorch as Charles Wheeler
Jimmie Quinn as Crook
Stanley J. Sandford as Hercules
Akka as a chimpanzee

See also
Gertrude Astor filmography

References

External links
Surviving Vitaphone soundtrack disk reel 7 at SoundCloud

1927 films
American silent feature films
Lost American films
1927 comedy films
Silent American comedy films
Films directed by Byron Haskin
American black-and-white films
Transitional sound films
Early sound films
1927 lost films
Lost comedy films
1920s American films